Weeton is the name of various locations in England:

Weeton, East Riding of Yorkshire
Weeton-with-Preese, Lancashire
Weeton, North Yorkshire